Joseph William Crockett (February 16, 1905 – July 11, 2001) was an American sport shooter who competed in the 1924 Summer Olympics. He was born in Washington, D. C. and died in Englewood, Colorado. In 1924 he won the gold medal as member of the American team in the team free rifle competition.

References

External links
profile

1905 births
2001 deaths
Sportspeople from Washington, D.C.
American male sport shooters
United States Distinguished Marksman
ISSF rifle shooters
Shooters at the 1924 Summer Olympics
Olympic gold medalists for the United States in shooting
Olympic medalists in shooting
Medalists at the 1924 Summer Olympics
20th-century American people
21st-century American people